Adenine (symbol A or Ade) is a nucleobase (a purine derivative). It is one of the four nucleobases in the nucleic acid of DNA that are represented by the letters G–C–A–T. The three others are guanine, cytosine and thymine. Its derivatives have a variety of roles in biochemistry including cellular respiration, in the form of both the energy-rich adenosine triphosphate (ATP) and the cofactors nicotinamide adenine dinucleotide (NAD), flavin adenine dinucleotide (FAD) and Coenzyme A. It also has functions in protein synthesis and as a chemical component of DNA and RNA. The shape of adenine is complementary to either thymine in DNA or uracil in RNA.

The adjacent image shows pure adenine, as an independent molecule. When connected into DNA, a covalent bond is formed between deoxyribose sugar and the bottom left nitrogen (thereby removing the existing hydrogen atom). The remaining structure is called an adenine residue, as part of a larger molecule. Adenosine is adenine reacted with ribose, as used in RNA and ATP; deoxyadenosine is adenine attached to deoxyribose, as used to form DNA.

Structure 

Adenine forms several tautomers, compounds that can be rapidly interconverted and are often considered equivalent. However, in isolated conditions, i.e. in an inert gas matrix and in the gas phase, mainly the 9H-adenine tautomer is found.

Biosynthesis 
Purine metabolism involves the formation of adenine and guanine. Both adenine and guanine are derived from the nucleotide inosine monophosphate (IMP), which in turn is synthesized from a pre-existing ribose phosphate through a complex pathway using atoms from the amino acids glycine, glutamine, and aspartic acid, as well as the coenzyme tetrahydrofolate.

Manufacturing method 
Patented Aug. 20, 1968, the current recognized method of industrial-scale production of adenine is a modified form of the formamide method. This method heats up formamide under 120 degree Celsius conditions within a sealed flask for 5 hours to form adenine. The reaction is heavily increased  in quantity by using a phosphorus oxychloride (phosphoryl chloride) or phosphorus pentachloride as an acid catalyst and sunlight or ultraviolet conditions. After the 5 hours have passed and the formamide-phosphorus oxychloride-adenine solution cools down, water is put into the flask containing the formamide and now-formed adenine. The water-formamide-adenine solution is then poured through a filtering column of activated charcoal. The water and formamide molecules, being small molecules, will pass through the charcoal and into the waste flask; the large adenine molecules, however, will attach or "adsorb" to the charcoal due to the van der Waals forces that interact between the adenine and the carbon in the charcoal. Because charcoal has a large surface area, it's able to capture the majority of molecules that pass a certain size (greater than water and formamide) through it. To extract the adenine from the charcoal-adsorbed adenine, ammonia gas dissolved in water (aqua ammonia) is poured onto the activated charcoal-adenine structure to liberate the adenine into the ammonia-water solution. The solution containing water, ammonia, and adenine is then left to air dry, with the adenine losing solubility due to the loss of ammonia gas that previously made the solution basic and capable of dissolving adenine, thus causing it to crystallize into a pure white powder that can be stored.

Function 
Adenine is one of the two purine nucleobases (the other being guanine) used in forming nucleotides of the nucleic acids. In DNA, adenine binds to thymine via two hydrogen bonds to assist in stabilizing the nucleic acid structures. In RNA, which is used for protein synthesis, adenine binds to uracil.

Adenine forms adenosine, a nucleoside, when attached to ribose, and deoxyadenosine when attached to deoxyribose. It forms adenosine triphosphate (ATP), a nucleoside triphosphate, when three phosphate groups are added to adenosine. Adenosine triphosphate is used in cellular metabolism as one of the basic methods of transferring chemical energy between chemical reactions. ATP is thus a derivative of adenine, adenosine, cyclic adenosine monophosphate, and adenosine diphosphate.

{| class="wikitable left" style="text-align:center"
|-
| 
| 
|-
| Adenosine, A
| Deoxyadenosine, dA
|}

History 

In older literature, adenine was sometimes called Vitamin B4. Due to it being synthesized by the body and not essential to be obtained by diet, it does not meet the definition of vitamin and is no longer part of the Vitamin B complex. However, two B vitamins, niacin and riboflavin, bind with adenine to form the essential cofactors nicotinamide adenine dinucleotide (NAD) and flavin adenine dinucleotide (FAD), respectively. Hermann Emil Fischer was one of the early scientists to study adenine.

It was named in 1885 by Albrecht Kossel after Greek ἀδήν aden "gland", in reference to the pancreas, from which Kossel's sample had been extracted.

Experiments performed in 1961 by Joan Oró have shown that a large quantity of adenine can be synthesized from the polymerization of ammonia with five hydrogen cyanide (HCN) molecules in aqueous solution; whether this has implications for the origin of life on Earth is under debate.

On August 8, 2011, a report, based on NASA studies with meteorites found on Earth, was published suggesting building blocks of DNA and RNA (adenine, guanine and related organic molecules) may have been formed extraterrestrially in outer space. In 2011, physicists reported that adenine has an "unexpectedly variable range of ionization energies along its reaction pathways" which suggested that "understanding experimental data on how adenine survives exposure to UV light is much more complicated than previously thought"; these findings have implications for spectroscopic measurements of heterocyclic compounds, according to one report.

References

External links 

 Vitamin B4 MS Spectrum

Nucleobases
Purines
Vitamins